Geoff(rey) Sullivan may refer to:

Geoff Sullivan (fictional character) in The Sullivans
Geoff Sullivan (politician), one of the Candidates of the Victorian state election, 2002
Geoffrey Sullivan, character in List of Unsolved Mysteries episodes

See also
Jeff Sullivan (disambiguation)
Jeffrey Sullivan (disambiguation)